Tse or TSE may refer to:

Computing
 Torque Game Engine Advanced, formerly Torque Shader Engine (TSE), a game engine produced and released by GarageGames
 IEEE Transactions on Software Engineering
 Windows NT 4.0 Terminal Server Edition (TSE), a Microsoft operating system that provided remote access

Education
 Toulouse School of Economics
 Turku School of Economics (TSE), a faculty of the University of Turku located in Turku, Finland
 TSE (examination), or Test of Spoken English, the most widely used assessment of spoken English worldwide

Finance
 Taiwan Stock Exchange (TSX), the principal stock exchange of Taiwan
 Tehran Stock Exchange (TSE), Iran's largest stock exchange
 Tirana Stock Exchange (TSE), the principal stock exchange in Albania
 Tokyo Stock Exchange (TSE), the second largest stock exchange in the world
 Toronto Stock Exchange (TSX), formerly TSE, the seventh largest stock exchange in the world

Medicine
 Transmissible spongiform encephalopathy (TSE), a group of progressive conditions that affect the brain and nervous system

Science and technology
  Turbo Spin Echo, a type of magnetic resonance imaging sequence

Business and industry
 Turkish Standards Institution (TSE), national standardization body in Turkey 
 Treated Sewage Effluent, a process for removing contaminants from waste water

Other
 former IATA code for Nursultan Nazarbayev (then Astana) International Airport in Kazakhstan; changed on 8 June 2020 to NQZ
 Tse (Cyrillic) (Ц, ц), a letter of the Cyrillic alphabet
 Xie (surname) (謝) a Chinese surname, romanised from Cantonese as Tse in Hong Kong

See also
 Tsetse fly